Fenwood can refer to:

 Fenwood, Saskatchewan, a village in Canada
 Fenwood, Wisconsin, a village in the USA